Shinobi Ninja is an American rock and hip hop band from Brooklyn, New York.

Origins
Prior to joining the band, Baby G (Edara Johnson) was a professional dancer for Rihanna, P Diddy, Daddy Yankee, Jason Derulo and others.

Meanwhile, Axis, Mike, and Dave were in a band called Wax Machine, which broke up in early 2008.  Shinobi Ninja formed shortly afterward. Several members of the band met at a rehearsal and recording studio called Progressive Music in the Film Center Building in the Hell's Kitchen neighborhood of Manhattan. Duke Sims (born March 19), Jonny, and Mike worked at the studio, and Baby G took vocal classes there.  In 2010, their original bass player Jonny left the band, and Alien Lex replaced him.

Of the six members of the band only Duke Sims and Alien Lex are originally from Brooklyn, both being born and raised in Bensonhurst. Lead singer Baby G is from Lawrence, Massachusetts. The twins Mike and Dave are from Piermont, New York. Axis Powers is originally from Toronto, Ontario, Canada. Jarobi White of A Tribe Called Quest is the official unofficial 7th member and has performed with the band numerous times forming Jarobi Ninja.

Career
On January 28, 2010, the band released Shinobi Ninja Attacks!, a Nintendo-style video game album for iPhone, iPod, and iPad. They are the first independent band to release an app based on their likeness and music.

On October 6, 2010, lead singer Baby G was the featured coach on MTV Made, Season 11 episode 11.

"Stop" was included in the third episode ("El Diablo") of the American television drama series The Killing, which aired on April 10, 2011 on AMC.

"Rock Hood" was featured in the video games NBA 2K12 (5 million copies Sold) and Tap Tap Revenge 3.

Their song "Amped to 12" was written specifically for the 2014 film A Haunted House 2.

In 2017 Spike Lee used their song "Genuine" in his new Netflix Series She's Gotta Have It.

Corey Taylor of Slipknot and Stone Sour played "What If Times" on Ep. 42 & "Saw Red" on Ep. 63 of his Beats 1 Apple Music Show A Series Of Bleeps in 2017.

They have been featured in Spin, The Source, Rolling Stone, Billboard and Time .

The band released their debut album, Rock Hood in April 2011. They followed this with the double album Escape from New York / Return From... in June 2014. In March 2017 they released their third album, Bless Up.

Their Logo Sticker which is a fluorescent pink and blue has been seen in 60 Minutes, Avengers: Infinity War, Uncut Gems, Catfight, Hip-Hop Evolution Season 2, Generation Iron 2,  and has been a staple in the fabric of New York City since their inception.

To date the band has released 50 music videos and 2 visual albums (Escape From New York and Bless Up).

Members
 Edara aka Baby G – vocals
 Terminator Dave – drums
 Doobie Duke Sims – vocals, guitar
 Alien Lex – bass guitar (2010–present)
 DJ Axis Powers – turntables, backing vocals
 Kid Shreddi aka Maniak Mike – guitar, backing vocals

Former members
 Jonathan Nunes Simone, aka Jonny on the Rocks – bass guitar (2008–2010)

Discography

Studio albums 
Rock Hood (2011) 
Escape from New York / Return From... (2014, Double Album)
Bless Up (2017)

EPs 
Brooklyn to Babylon (2009) 
The Video Game EP (2010)
LiL Bud B-Sides (2011)
The Chronicles of DAB & Friends (2014)
Artistic Visions (2015)

Mixtapes 
Blunts & Nunchucks (2010)
The Chronicles of Hashy Larry (2011)

Non-album singles 
"ILL ISH" (2012)
"Rusty Stab" (2012)
"I'm the One" (2013)
"The Sounds of Calizona" (2013)
"Acid Man" (2014)
"MeUWe" featuring Dinco D (Leaders of the New School) (2014)
"FunBang" maxi single (2016)
"Monks in the Moshpit" featuring Wordspit the Illest (2016)
"K.U.N.T" produced by DJ Jawa (2016)

Live albums 
Live at the Bitter End (7/4/09)
Live at Converse Rubber Tracks (11/11/11)

Van album 
The Monster Van Album (2014)

References

External links 
Official website

Musical groups established in 2008
Musical groups from Brooklyn
Rock music groups from New York (state)